Jean Carlos Macedo da Silva (born August 9, 1980 in Campinas), known as Jean Carlos or simply Jean, is a Brazilian attacking midfielder, currently playing for Sport Club Internacional on loan from São Caetano.

Contract
Inter (Loan) 5 February 2007 to 31 December 2007
São Caetano 1 February 2006 to 31 January 2009

External links
CBF

Placar 

1980 births
Living people
Brazilian footballers
Associação Atlética Ponte Preta players
São Paulo FC players
Associação Desportiva São Caetano players
Sport Club Internacional players
Campeonato Brasileiro Série A players
Association football midfielders
Sportspeople from Campinas